Harris Bokhari  is the founder and a trustee at the Patchwork Foundation, for which he won the Diversity Champion of the Year Award in early 2018. The Patchwork Foundation is a charity that aims to "promote and encourage the positive integration of disadvantaged and minority communities into British democracy and civil society."

Bokhari is a diversity champion and is a member of the Equality, Diversity and Inclusion (EDI) Advisory Group, which will shape, influence and guide the delivery of the Mayor of London's Equality, Diversity and Inclusion Strategy. He is also an independent member of the "Community and Voluntary Service" of the Honours Committee and is credited to help increase diverse representation for the awards. Bokhari is a member of the National Assessment Committee of the Queen's Award for Voluntary Service which plays a key role in the awards process. 

Conservative Party campaign strategist Sir Lynton Crosby, who is a patron of Patchwork, described Bokhari as "Captain Networker".

Bokhari was appointed by the Prime Minister on 11 May 2020 as a trustee of the Natural History Museum, making him one of only three Muslim trustees in major British museums, and currently the only British-born Muslim.

Early life 
Bokhari grew up in Epsom, Surrey and was active in community events and helping people from a young age. His Punjabi-born father was the first British Muslim to run a secondary school in the UK; he was headteacher of Ernest Bevin College and was awarded an OBE for services to education in the 2001 Birthday Honours. Liberal Democrat London Assembly Member Hina Bokhari is his older sister.

Career 
Bokhari graduated from Imperial College, London in 1999 with a BSc in Mathematics and was awarded their Distinguished Alumni Award 2020. Bokhari is a chartered accountant and is a tax and financial advisor. He has worked for PwC, KPMG and Baker Tilly, and is currently an Independent Financial Advisor.

He regularly writes for the Evening Standard, The Independent and Times Educational Supplement.

Public service

Mosaic Network 
Harris Bokhari was appointed as first honorary patron of The Prince's Trust Mosaic Network, where he is a National Advisory Board member. In 2013, he was among thirty-three philanthropists honoured by the Beacon Awards for collectively giving more than £100m to charitable causes. He was awarded the Beacon Award for Philanthropy Advocate for raising £1 million within 12 months for various charities working in deprived communities in the UK.

Naz Legacy Foundation 
Bokhari is also founder of the Naz Legacy Foundation, which was established in honour of the legacy of his father, Naz Bokhari, the first Muslim secondary school head-teacher in Britain. The Naz Legacy Foundation received Prime Minister David Cameron's Big Society Award in 2014.

Bokhari's interfaith work has included organising the first ever engagement event between national community, women and youth leaders from the Jewish and Muslim communities meeting with the new Chief Rabbi in Finchley Kinloss Synagogue. He was one of the first Muslims to be invited to the Chief Rabbi's installation ceremony. He also organised the first youth interfaith iftar at Lambeth Palace, which brought together the Archbishop of Canterbury, Chief Rabbi, Mayor of London and over 100 youth leaders from each of London's boroughs.

Other recognition 
Bokhari was awarded an OBE in the 2015 Birthday Honours, and was listed as an 'Equality Champion' in the Evening Standard's Progress 1000 list of most influential Londoners. He also won the Alija Izetbegovic Award for Good Citizenship from The Muslim News Awards in 2016.

Simon Woolley of Operation Black Vote praised Bokhari's work "for his services to young people and interfaith... With his easy charm and steely determination Bokhari can call upon the top political figures to talk to the young men and women on his schemes. He's even become an ambassador for the HRH Prince Charles. Well done Harris, your father, who also received an OBE, would be deeply proud of his son."

Muslim community activism 
Bokhari was a spokesperson for the Muslim Association of Britain from 2006 to 2008. 

In 2007, Bokhari was appointed press officer for the launch of Mosques and Imams National Advisory Board (MINAB), which was attended by the Communities Secretary Hazel Blears. Soon after the Government stopped working with many of these organisations, Bokhari had already moved on to other projects and initiatives outside of the Muslim communities.

Position on Israel and anti-Semitism 

In 2002, Bokhari organised protests in London, attended by thousands of people "to express their solidarity with the Palestinians and against Israel's ongoing military operations in the West Bank."

In 2019, Bokhari organized the first inter-faith Iftar with the Chief Rabbi at St John's Wood synagogue. It resulted in a number of synagogues across London organising their own Iftars. Bokhari reportedly said: "We need to call out all forms of prejudice and racism in society and it is important we speak out against anti- semitism in the same way we have to speak out against Islamophobia."

Position on UK foreign policy 

Bokhari told the Socialist Worker: "We have been saying that British foreign policy is a problem since day one, even before the war in Afghanistan...and it is not just Muslims saying this. The two million who marched against war in Iraq were not majority Muslim. The 100,000 that marched against the war in Lebanon and Gaza are not majority Muslim. The Chatham House foreign policy research institute has been saying it. A lot of people up and down the country are very upset about Britain's foreign policy. We would be ignoring our moral duty if we did not speak out. And it's very naive for ministers to say that this not a problem." 

Bokhari was asked by the BBC about his reaction to a British government proposal to incorporate teaching of "core British values" into citizenship classes in schools to help "tackle extremism and discrimination." Bokhari said "this is just another one of those knee-jerk reactions where we're not actually looking at the core problem. What was the reason why these people actually committed these disgusting acts? Unfortunately it was our foreign policy, it was the issue of the illegal war, the illegal occupation of Iraq, the war in Afghanistan, the continuing abuses of the Palestinian people, the illegal occupation of Palestine by the Israeli state. So I think until the government actually addresses these issues unfortunately we'll keep on having these problems in the UK particularly."

Bokhari was interviewed following the publication and distribution of the Danish cartoons of Muhammed, concerning calls by Muslim groups to boycott the West. Bokhari said: 'We live in a democratic society and have the right to choose what we buy. International companies have an influence over governments and the media, and can also influence global politics. They have to understand that if they're going to cause offence, then we're not going to buy their products." Bokhari believed the boycott will spread to products made in other countries, and predicts Germany will be next, after several newspapers defended their right to publish the cartoons.

Position on Ahmadiyya community 

In 2010, according to The New Yorker, Bokhari told a group of British Muslims in the Tooting constituency to vote for Labour Party candidate Sadiq Khan instead of Liberal Democrat candidate Nasser Butt, a member of the Ahmadiyya. "The majority of Muslims in this area are voting Lib Dem, because they think Nasser Butt is a Muslim," Bokhari told a room of Muslim voters as the reason why they should not vote for Butt. "You need to go into the community and take these posters down…. All you need to do is just look for Sadiq Khan, Labour Party, and just tick it… Whatever else you vote is up to you." Bokhari later told the author that he does not remember the meeting.

In 2017, Bokhari talked about his work with young people from minority faith communities who face prejudices, including youth in the Ahmadiyya community. In 2019, he wrote in The Independent and the Evening Standard calling out the prejudice and hatred towards the Ahmadiyya community. 

In November 2019, Bokhari visited the Baitul Futuh Mosque and was welcomed by their Head of External Relations. They discussed their work in bringing communities together.

Work on Countering Violent Extremism (CVE) 
In July 2019, Bokhari, a grassroots expert in Countering Violent Extremism (CVE) was invited to attend the Home Secretary's speech, Confronting Extremism Together. Bokhari, who organised the Woolwich interfaith event following the murder of Lee Rigby in 2013, the Christchurch vigil at the Islamic Cultural Centre and memorial at New Zealand House in 2019, was invited by the US State Department on their International Visitor Leadership Programme on CVE in 2017. Bokhari launched the Youth Mentoring Program in Partnership with the Embassy of the United States, London in December 2019.

Work during COVID-19 pandemic 
Bokhari had been instrumental in getting Mosques closed during the crisis and was described as a leading campaigner to keep Muslims at home during Ramadan, by organising virtual iftars during 2020, which were attended by more than 75,000 people. Bokhari started the Naz Legacy iftars, which were launched by the Prince of Wales and attended by Archbishop of Canterbury Justin Welby, Cardinal Vincent Nichols, the Bishop of London Sarah Mullally and the Chief Rabbi Ephraim Mirvis.

References 

British Muslims
Living people
British philanthropists
British people of Punjabi descent
Year of birth missing (living people)